= Hexagonocaulon =

Hexagonocaulon Temporal range: Middle Triassic

Scientific classification
- Kingdom: Plantae
- Genus: †Hexagonocaulon

Extinct genus of plants

Hexagonocaulon is an extinct genus of bryophyte that lived during the Middle Triassic. Its fossils have been found throughout the Southern Hemisphere, including the Antarctic Peninsula.

The plant is believed to have been small in size and to have reproduced through spores. Of the bryophytes, Hexagonocaulon is considered to be most closely related to the liverworts.
